Lamont v. Postmaster General, 381 U.S. 301 (1965), was a landmark First Amendment Supreme Court case, in which the ruling of the Supreme Court struck down § 305(a) of the Postal Service and Federal Employees Salary Act of 1962, a federal statute requiring the Postmaster General to detain and deliver only upon the addressee's request unsealed foreign mailings of "communist political propaganda."

Background
39 U.S.C. 4008 (1964) required the U.S. Postmaster General to detain and not deliver "communist political propaganda," unless a recipient affirmatively indicated their consent to receive such materials through the mail.  Dr. Corliss Lamont had a copy of the Peking Review detained and declined to respond to the government's inquiry as to whether he wished to receive the delivery.  Lamont subsequently filed suit alleging that Section 4008 violated his 1st Amendment and 5th Amendment rights.

Opinion of the court
The Court held:the Act, as construed and applied, is unconstitutional, since it imposes on the addressee an affirmative obligation which amounts to an unconstitutional limitation of his rights under the First Amendment.

The Court was unanimous in the judgment (8-0, with Justice White recused). Justice Brennan wrote a concurring opinion (which Justice Goldberg joined) and Justice Harlan also wrote a concurring opinion.

See also 
Chilling effect

References

Further reading

External links
 
 

Anti-communism in the United States
United States Supreme Court cases
United States Supreme Court cases of the Warren Court
United States Free Speech Clause case law
1965 in United States case law
American Civil Liberties Union litigation
United States Postal Service litigation
China–United States relations
United States Fifth Amendment self-incrimination case law